Heliura mimula is a moth of the subfamily Arctiinae. It was described by Max Wilhelm Karl Draudt in 1917. It is found in French Guiana.

References

 

Arctiinae
Moths described in 1917
Moths of South America